K04QR-D (channel 38) is a low-power television station licensed to Esparto, California, United States, as an affiliate of beIN Sports Xtra. The station is owned by HC2 Holdings. K04QR-D's transmitter is located in the Crescent Ridge Village area in El Dorado Hills, California.

History

In June 2013, K04QR-D was slated to be sold to Landover 5 LLC as part of a larger deal involving 51 other low-power television stations; the sale fell through in June 2016. Mako Communications sold its stations, including K04QR-D, to HC2 Holdings in 2017.

Technical information

Subchannels
The station's digital channel is multiplexed:

Analog-to-digital conversion
In 2008, the station flash-cut to digital. This was made before the transition to DTV was required by the FCC.

References

External links
 

04QR-D
Low-power television stations in the United States
Innovate Corp.
Classic Reruns TV affiliates